Thomas, Thom or Tom Barry may refer to:

Politics
Thomas Barry (English politician) (fl. 1413), MP for Plympton Erle
Tom Barry (politician) (born 1968), Irish Fine Gael TD for Cork East from 2011

Sports
Tom Barry (baseball) (1879–1946), Major League pitcher with the Philadelphia Phillies
Thomas A. Barry ( 1879–1947), American football player and coach
Tom Barry (rugby league) (1901–?), Australian rugby league footballer
Tom Barry (rugby league, University), Australian rugby league footballer
Tom Barry (hurler) (1903–1984), Irish hurler
Tom Barry (London hurler) (1879–1969), Irish sportsman and revolutionary figure
Thomas J. Barry (1907–1987), American horse trainer

Others
Thomas Barry (actor) (1743–1768), Irish stage actor and theatre manager
Thom Barry (active 1995–2013), American actor and disk jockey
Thomas Barry (clown) (c. 1810–1857), British circus clown
Thomas Henry Barry (1855–1919), United States Army Major General
Tom Barry (screenwriter) (1885–1931), American playwright and screenwriter
Tom Barry (Irish republican) (1897–1980), Irish Republican Army leader

See also
Thomas Barrie (died 1538), British almoner
Thomas de Barry ( 1560), canon of Glasgow and chief magistrate of Bothwell